Events from the year 1119 in Ireland.

Incumbents
High King of Ireland: Domnall Ua Lochlainn

Events
 Máel Máedóc Ua Morgair (Saint Malachy) was made a priest, as vicar to Celsus.

Deaths
c.10 March – Muirchertach Ua Briain, reigning King of Munster since 1086 and claimant to the Kingship of Ireland
 Aedh Ua Con Ceannainn, King of Uí Díarmata.

References